John Edgar Harvey  (4 April 1920 – 13 January 2008) was a British Conservative Party politician.

Early life
Harvey was born in Derry. He attended Xavierian College in Bruges and Lyme Regis Grammar School. During the Second World War, he served in the Merchant Navy.

Parliamentary career
He was elected at the 1955 general election as Member of Parliament (MP) for Walthamstow East, retaining the seat with a majority of 1,129 over the sitting Labour MP Harry Wallace.  Harvey held his seat at the next two general elections, until his defeat at the  1966 election by Labour's William Robinson.

After politics
After losing his seat in 1966, he left politics to concentrate on his business career. He was a director and deputy chairman of Burmah Castrol Europe until his retirement. Harvey lived in Loughton, and was a verderer of Epping Forest.

He was appointed CBE in the 1994 Birthday Honours for political and public service.

Harvey should not be confused with John Harvey-Jones, former chairman of ICI who died in the same week.

References

UK General Elections since 1832

Obituary, The Independent, 17 January 2008
Obituary in The Times, 30 January 2008

External links 

1920 births
2008 deaths
People from Loughton
Conservative Party (UK) MPs for English constituencies
UK MPs 1955–1959
UK MPs 1959–1964
UK MPs 1964–1966
Commanders of the Order of the British Empire
Burmah-Castrol